SS Lexington was an American Passenger ship that collided with Jane Christenson and sank on 2 January 1935 on the East River in New York City while carrying general cargo and 201 passengers and crew from New York to Providence, Rhode Island.

Construction 
Lexington was built at the Harlan & Hollingsworth shipyard in Wilmington, Delaware in 1890. Where she was launched and completed that same year. The ship could reach a maximum speed of 15 knots.

Sinking 
Lexington left New York City on a voyage to Providence, Rhode Island on 2 January 1935 while carrying a general cargo and 201 passengers and crew. While she was steaming along the East River to reach New York Harbor, the ship collided with the SS Jane Christenson. The Jane Christenson broke the Lexington in half and sank her in the shallow waters, resulting in the death of 6 crew members. The 195 survivors were led back to shore and the Jane Christenson's damage was repaired after which she continued service until 1967.

Wreck 
The partly sunken wreck was scrapped as it posed a danger to other ships in the river.

References

1890 ships
Ships built by Harlan and Hollingsworth
Passenger ships of the United States
Ships sunk in collisions
Maritime incidents in 1935
Steamships of the United States
Shipwrecks in rivers
Shipwrecks of the East River